Gregorio López-Bravo y Castro (29 December 1923 in Madrid, Spain – 19 February 1985 in Bilbao, Spain) was a Spanish politician who served as Minister of Foreign Affairs between 1969 and 1973. He died in the Mount Oiz plane crash.

1923 births
1985 deaths
Foreign ministers of Spain
Foreign relations of Spain during the Francoist dictatorship
Opus Dei members
Victims of aviation accidents or incidents in 1985
Victims of aviation accidents or incidents in Spain
Government ministers during the Francoist dictatorship